Ed Sullivan Jr. (born 1969 in Mundelein, Illinois) is a Republican member of the Illinois House of Representatives, representing the 51st district since 2003.

After receiving a B.A. in History and Political Science from the University of Illinois at Urbana–Champaign in 1991, Sullivan Jr. served as an aide to U.S. Congressman Phil Crane (IL-8). In 1993, he was elected to the first of five terms as the Fremont Township Assessor.

In April 2013, Rep. Sullivan became the second Republican representative in Illinois to support the state's same-sex marriage bill. He did not run for re-election in 2016.

Early life and education
Sullivan Jr. is a graduate of Carmel High School.  He received a B.A. in History and Political Science from the University of Illinois at Urbana–Champaign in 1991.

Professional experience
Sullivan Jr. served as an aide to U.S. Congressman Phil Crane (IL-8).  He was elected to his first term as the Fremont Township Assessor in 1993, and went on to serve four additional terms.

District and legislation

The 51st State Representative District is a hook-shaped geographical area encompassing a wide range of suburban demographics in Lake County, Illinois, that includes all or substantial parts of the Illinois communities of Lake Zurich, Kildeer, Deer Park, Long Grove, Hawthorne Woods, Libertyville, Mundelein, Green Oaks, and Waukegan, Illinois.

Rep. Sullivan Jr. served as Assistant Republican Leader for the 98th session of the Illinois General Assembly. His committee assignments included Executive, Consumer Protection, and Rules where he was the "Republican Spokesperson" (ranking minority party member), as well as Mass Transit, Public Utilities, and Revenue and Finance.

Historical legislative efforts by Rep. Sullivan Jr. include extensive work on tax legislation and work on anti-gang initiatives.  He was one of two Republican representatives in Illinois to support a same-sex marriage bill in April 2013.

The Illinois branch of the Republican-associated Opportunity Project (IOP), a self-described "research and public policy enterprise" advocating conservative state legislation and policies in support of "free markets and free minds" [a 501(c)(4) tax exempt organization], scored Rep. Sullivan Jr. in 2012 at 88 on a scale of 100; a grade of "A−", it was a score tied for 3rd highest of the 120 members of the Illinois House evaluated.

Personal life
Sullivan Jr. is married; his wife, Trish, is a family nurse practitioner. They live in Mundelein with daughter Kaileigh and son Edwin.

Further reading  
 Bills where this Rep. appeared as primary sponsor (with link in each leading to all sponsored bills): 98th General Assembly (GA), ; 97th GA, ; 96th GA, ; 95th GA, ; 94th GA, ; 93rd GA,

References

External links
 Personal website, 
 

1969 births
Living people
People from Mundelein, Illinois
University of Illinois Urbana-Champaign alumni
Republican Party members of the Illinois House of Representatives
21st-century American politicians